Jacobus "Koos" Verhoeff (20 February 1927 – 19 March 2018) was a Dutch mathematician, computer scientist, and artist. He is known for his work on error detection and correction, and on information retrieval. He has also held exhibitions of his mathematically inspired sculptures. 

He is best known for his check-digit Verhoeff algorithm, which is based on the dihedral group of order 10.

His son, Tom Verhoeff, is a mathematician and computer scientist.

Selected publications

References

1927 births
2018 deaths
20th-century Dutch mathematicians
Dutch computer scientists
Academic staff of Erasmus University Rotterdam
University of Amsterdam alumni
Scientists from The Hague